Ronald Richard Schueler (born April 18, 1948) is an American former professional baseball pitcher, pitching coach, executive and scout. Over the course of his eight-year playing career in Major League Baseball (MLB), Schueler played for the Atlanta Braves, Philadelphia Phillies, Minnesota Twins and Chicago White Sox. 

Schueler then spent nearly four decades as a pitching coach, scout, and front office executive.

Early life and career
Born in Catharine in Ellis County, Kansas, Schueler graduated from Hays High School, where he played baseball and basketball, then went on to attend Fort Hays State University.

On September 7, at 22 years old, Schueler tossed a no-hitter for Double-A Shreveport.

Major leagues
Schueler was called up at the start of the  season at twenty-three years old. On April 16, 1972, two days before his twenty-fourth birthday, Schueler made his major league debut as a reliever in a game against the San Diego Padres at San Diego Stadium. He pitched two innings and only gave up one hit in that game, but despite his efforts, the Braves lost. Schueler went on to start thirty-eight games over two years with the Braves.

Schueler was dealt from the Braves to the Phillies for Craig Robinson and Barry Lersch at the Winter Meetings on December 3, 1973. After a mediocre season as a starter, the Phillies converted Schueler to a relief pitcher. He pitched two more seasons in Philadelphia as a reliever and spot starter.

Just days before the  season began, the Minnesota Twins purchased Schueler from the Phillies. With the Twins, he pitched as a reliever and spot starter, as he did in Philadelphia. Schueler's stay with the Twins lasted only one season, as he became a free agent after the  season. A month after becoming a free agent, Schueler was signed by the Chicago White Sox to be a reliever and spot starter.

Over the course of his MLB career, he posted a won–lost mark of 40–48 and an earned run average of 4.08. In 291 career games pitched, including 86 as a starting pitcher, he threw 13 complete games and two shutouts, with 11 saves out of the bullpen. He allowed 861 hits and 393 bases on balls, with 563 strikeouts, in 912 innings pitched.

Pitching coach
Schueler ended his active career at age 31 to become pitching coach of the White Sox in the middle of the 1979 season, after the illness and death of veteran instructor Fred Martin. He remained with the ChiSox through the  season. 

In , Schueler was hired by the Oakland Athletics to be their pitching coach. Schueler worked for three seasons in Oakland. Schueler joined the Pittsburgh Pirates in  after a year out of the majors.

Front office
He only stayed with the Pirates for a year before returning to Oakland, this time in the front office as a special assistant to general manager Sandy Alderson. Schueler worked in the Athletics' front office for four seasons, including the  season in which the Athletics won the World Series.

In , Schueler returned to the White Sox as their general manager. As the general manager, Schueler was responsible for acquiring veterans such as Ellis Burks, Tim Raines, Bo Jackson, Julio Franco and José Valentín. He was their general manager for ten years, stepping down on October 24, 2000 to become senior vice president of the franchise, a scout, a special consultant to chairman Jerry Reinsdorf, and an adviser to general manager Ken Williams. He worked in this new position through the  season.

Before the  season, he was hired by the Chicago Cubs as a special assistant to the president and general manager. Two years later, the St. Louis Cardinals hired Schueler to be the special assistant to the general manager. He was part of the 2006 Cardinals organization that won the World Series. In , the San Francisco Giants hired Schueler to be a scout and evaluate major and minor league players and acquisitions. In November 2009, The Washington Nationals hired Schueler as special adviser to GM Mike Rizzo.

Personal life
Schueler has a wife, Linda, and two stepchildren, Jennifer and Christina. They live in Paradise Valley, Arizona.
Schueler has two children Kacey and Carey from a previous marriage.

References

External links

Ron Schueler at Baseball Gauge
Chicago White Sox front office biography
Giants front office biography

1948 births
Living people
Atlanta Braves players
Baltimore Orioles scouts
Baseball players from Kansas
Chicago White Sox coaches
Chicago White Sox executives
Chicago White Sox players
Greenwood Braves players
Kinston Eagles players
Major League Baseball bench coaches
Major League Baseball general managers
Major League Baseball pitchers
Major League Baseball pitching coaches
Minnesota Twins players
Philadelphia Phillies players
Oakland Athletics coaches
Oakland Athletics scouts
Pittsburgh Pirates coaches
Richmond Braves players
St. Louis Cardinals scouts
San Francisco Giants scouts
Savannah Braves players
Shreveport Braves players
Washington Nationals scouts